PipeWire is a server for handling audio, video streams, and hardware on Linux. It was created by Wim Taymans at Red Hat. It handles multimedia routing and pipeline processing.

History
In 2015, Taymans started work on PipeWire. It was based on ideas from several existing projects, including one called PulseVideo by William Manley. According to Red Hat's Christian Schaller, it drew many of its ideas from an early PulseVideo prototype by Manley and builds upon some of the code that was merged into GStreamer due to that effort. A goal of the project was to improve handling of video on Linux in the same way that PulseAudio improved handling of audio.

Although a separate project from PulseAudio, Taymans initially considered using the name "PulseVideo" for the new project. By June 2015, the name "Pinos" was being used, after the city Pinos de Alhaurin in Spain, where Taymans used to live.

Initially, Pinos only handled video streams. By early 2017, Taymans had started working on integrating audio streams. Taymans wanted to support both consumer and professional audio use cases, and consulted Paul Davis and Robin Gareus for advice on implementation for professional audio. At this time, the name PipeWire was adopted for the project.

In November 2018, PipeWire was re-licensed from the LGPL to the MIT License.

In April 2021, Fedora Linux 34 became the first Linux distribution to ship PipeWire for audio by default. A year later, Pop! OS adopted it as the default audio server in version 22.04. It was made the default audio server in Ubuntu beginning with version 22.10.

Features 
The project aims include:
 To work with sandboxed Flatpak applications.
 To provide secure methods for screenshotting and screencasting on Wayland compositors.
 To unify handling of cases managed by JACK and PulseAudio.

Reception 

PipeWire has received much praise, especially among the GNOME and Arch Linux communities. Particularly as it fixes problems that some PulseAudio users had experienced, including high CPU usage, Bluetooth connection issues, and JACK backend issues.

References

External links 
 
 Presentation of Pinos by Wim Taymans
 The PipeWire multimedia framework and its potential in AGL (PDF)
 PulseVideo
 PipeWire: A Low-Level multimedia subsystem (PDF)
PipeWire Under The Hood
Audio software for Linux

Video software for Linux